Josh McKay may refer to:

 Josh McKay (musician), American musician
 Josh McKay (rugby union) (born 1997), New Zealand rugby union player
 Josh McKay (soccer) (born 1971), American soccer player